Roy Emerton (9 October 1892 – 30 November 1944) was a British film actor.

Earlier in his life, he was a sailor, stoker, docker, railway worker, and miner and served in the First World War. He played in a great number of popular London stage plays and shows, including Shakespeare, as well as film work.

Partial filmography

 Shadows (1931) - Captain
 The Sign of Four (1932) - The Tattooed Man
 That Night in London (1932) - Captain Paulson
 The Lash (1934) - Steve
 Java Head (1934) - Broadrick
 Lorna Doone (1934) - Carver Doone
 The Triumph of Sherlock Holmes (1935) - Boss McGinty
 It Happened in Paris (1935) - Gendarme
 Tudor Rose (1936) - Squire (uncredited)
 Pot Luck (1936) - Berkeley
 Everything Is Thunder (1936) - Kostner
 The Great Barrier (1937) - Moody
 Big Fella (1937) - Spike
 Doctor Syn (1937) - Capt. Howard Collyer, R.N.
 The Last Adventurers (1937) - John Arkell
 I, Claudius (1937) - Octavius
 The Drum (1938) - Wafadar
 Convict 99 (1938) - Colonial
 The Gang Show (1938) - Pearson, Theatre Royal Proprietor
 Everything Happens to Me (1938)
 Q Planes (1939) - Viking First Mate (uncredited)
 Home from Home (1939) - Bill Burton
 The Good Old Days (1940) - Grimes
 Busman's Honeymoon (1940) - Noakes
 The Case of the Frightened Lady (1940) - Gilder
 The Thief of Bagdad (1940) - Jailer
 Old Mother Riley's Circus (1941) - Santley, circus owner
 The Young Mr. Pitt (1942) - Dan Mendoza
 The Man in Grey (1943) - Gamekeeper (uncredited)
 The Adventures of Tartu (1943) - Plant Guard / Member of Underground (uncredited)
 Time Flies (1944) - Capt. John Smith
 Welcome, Mr. Washington (1944) - Selby
 Love Story (1944) - Cornish Fisherman
 Henry V (1944) - Lieutenant Bardolph (final film role)

References

External links
 

1892 births
1944 deaths
English male film actors
English male stage actors
People from Burford
20th-century English male actors
British military personnel of World War I
Military personnel from Oxfordshire